The Borġ l-Imramma site is a major building of the temple period. Near the structure, cart ruts and a dolmen can also be observed.

Structure 
he temple shares some of the characteristics of the usual Maltese Megalithic temple such as the Hagar Qim or Ggantija temples. This courtyard was presumably open to the sky. Clustered on its north, west and south sides are a number of small, again nearly circular chambers. An entrance passage for the courtyard is on the northwest wall. This passage is made from large, squared stones. This entrance's rocks are the strongest in structural integrity ever found in Malta. The bottom part has not yet been excavated but large portions of chert can be seen. The structure is believed to date back around 4100 to 3000 BCE.

Later use 
It is also speculated that the Phoenicians used the temple for unknown purposes.

Etymology 

 Borg - Widely known as the expression of ''An amount of rocks placed on top of each other."
 Imramma - A colloquial type of rodent, usually spoken as "Gurdien tal-Imramma"

References 

History of Malta
Megalithic Temples of Malta
Sannat
Phoenician temples